This is a list of all cricketers who have played first-class or List A cricket for Redco Pakistan Limited cricket team. The team played ten first-class matches and six List A matches between 1999 and 2000. Seasons given are first and last seasons; the player did not necessarily play in all the intervening seasons.

Players

 Adnan Naeem, 1999/00
 Agha Shakeel, 1999/00
 Ahmed Kundi, 1999/00
 Ahmer Saeed, 1999/00
 Atif Mahmood, 1999/00
 Bazid Khan, 1999/00
 Hafeez Qureshi, 1999/00
 Hasnain Qayyum, 1999/00
 Imran Tahir, 1999/00
 Imtiaz-ul-Haq, 1999/00
 Jannisar Khan, 1999/00
 Kashif Raza, 1999/00
 Mohammad Khalil, 1999/00
 Mohammad Naeem, 1999/00
 Mushtaq Ahmed, 1999/00
 Naumanullah, 1999/00
 Naved Ashraf, 1999/00
 Rafatullah Mohmand, 1999/00
 Shabbir Ahmed, 1999/00
 Shabbir Khan, 1999/00
 Shadab Kabir, 1999/00
 Ummar Babari, 1999/00
 Waqar Younis, 1999/00
 Waqas Ahmed, 1999/00
 Wasim Yousufi, 1999/00
 Yasir Arafat, 1999/00
 Zeeshan Pervez, 1999/00

References

Redco Pakistan Limited cricketers